Alexander William Black (28 February 1859 – 29 December 1906) was a Liberal Party politician in Scotland.

Originally trained as a lawyer, he was elected at the 1900 general election as the Member of Parliament (MP) for Banffshire, and was re-elected in 1906. However he died in December that year from injuries received in a railway accident at Elliot Junction, forcing a by-election early in 1907.

In later life he is listed as living at 5 Learmonth Terrace in western Edinburgh.

He is buried near his home, in the north section of Dean Cemetery in Edinburgh towards the south-west corner of the north section. He is buried with his wife Ellinor (1885–1918), some 26 years his junior.

References

External links 
 

1859 births
1906 deaths
Scottish Liberal Party MPs
Members of the Parliament of the United Kingdom for Scottish constituencies
UK MPs 1900–1906
UK MPs 1906–1910
Railway accident deaths in Scotland